John G. Adair is a Canadian psychologist whose work was concerned with the social nature and ethics of psychological research.

Career
Adair obtained his PhD in social psychology from the University of Iowa in 1965. He then obtained a faculty position at the University of Manitoba, Winnipeg where he stayed for the remainder of his academic career retiring as Emeritus Professor of Psychology in 1999.

He was an active member of regional, national and international psychological associations.

Research
Adair's research considered such issues as the social nature of human research methodology, the ethics of research with
human subjects, social science research policy, indigenization and development of the discipline in developing countries, and the internationalization of psychology.

Publications

 Vohra, N., & Adair, J. (2000). Life Satisfaction of Indian Immigrants in Canada. Psychology and Developing Societies.
 Adair, J.G. (Ed). (1998). Advances in Psychological Science: Social, Personal, and Cultural Aspects.
 Adair, J.G. The human subject; the social psychology of the psychological experiment.

Positions
 President, Canadian Psychological Association (1980)
 Honorary Life Fellow, Canadian Psychological Association

Awards
 2001: Interamerican Psychology Award for Distinguished Contributions to the Development of Psychology as a Science and as a Profession in the Americas, Interamerican Psychological Society
 Fellow, Canadian Psychological Association

References

Canadian psychologists
20th-century Canadian psychologists
Living people
Social psychologists
Academic staff of the University of Manitoba
Year of birth missing (living people)
Presidents of the Canadian Psychological Association